McLeod John Baltazar Bethel-Thompson (born July 3, 1988) is an American professional gridiron football quarterback for the New Orleans Breakers of the United States Football League (USFL). He was a member of the Toronto Argonauts of the Canadian Football League (CFL), and won two Grey Cup championships with the team: one as a back-up quarterback in 2017, another as the team's starter in 2022. He played college football at UCLA and Sacramento State. He is the grandson of the 1948 Olympic shot put champion Wilbur 'Moose' Thompson. Bethel-Thompson is a journeyman quarterback having been a member of five different NFL teams, two CFL teams, and one team in both the Arena Football League and the United Football League.

High school career
Bethel-Thompson graduated from San Francisco's Balboa High School in 2006, where he played football, basketball, and baseball. He was the City's Football Player of the Year in 2006 and its Back of the Year in 2005. In 2004 and 2005, he led his team to the Turkey Bowl, the City's annual championship, held on Thanksgiving Day in Kezar Stadium.

College career

After a redshirt year at UCLA in 2006, Bethel-Thompson shared the Bruins' quarterback duties in the 2007 season. He started in the 2007 Las Vegas Bowl where the Bruins lost to BYU. Bethel-Thompson saw action in five games for UCLA in 2007, completing 23 of 55 passes for 293 yards, with one touchdown and five interceptions.

Bethel-Thompson played at Sacramento State from 2008 to 2010. In three seasons at Sacramento State, Bethel-Thompson appeared in 12 games, completing 113 of 197 passes for 1,322 yards, with seven touchdowns and eight interceptions.

Statistics

Source:

Professional career

San Jose SaberCats
After going undrafted in the 2011 NFL Draft, Bethel-Thompson joined the San Jose SaberCats of the Arena Football League. During three games played, Bethel-Thompson completed 20 out of 43 passes for 220 yards, 3 touchdowns, and 1 interception, as well as 2 rushes for 24 yards.

San Francisco 49ers
Bethel-Thompson played for the San Francisco 49ers for a short time, and was expected to be the third-string quarterback for the 49ers after Josh McCown was cut, but was later cut himself.

Sacramento Mountain Lions
On September 3, 2011, Bethel-Thompson signed with the Sacramento Mountain Lions. Bethel-Thompson competed with Jordan Palmer, former Fresno State quarterback Ryan Colburn, and Trevor Harris for the starting job. Bethel-Thompson ended up starting the last two games at quarterback over Colburn. Palmer was released and Harris signed with the Orlando Predators.

Miami Dolphins
Later in 2011, Bethel-Thompson signed to the Miami Dolphins practice squad.

Minnesota Vikings
Bethel-Thompson signed a future contract with the Minnesota Vikings on January 13, 2012. He was named to the 53-man active roster just before the start of the 2012 regular season after beating out veteran Sage Rosenfels for the third-string quarterback job. He was released on October 8, 2013, when the Vikings signed Josh Freeman.

San Francisco 49ers (second stint)
Bethel-Thompson was claimed off waivers by the San Francisco 49ers from the Minnesota Vikings on October 9, 2013. He was put on waivers by the 49ers on November 26, 2013, then signed to the practice squad a day  later. He was signed to a reserve/future deal and was activated to the active roster on January 23, 2014. The 49ers waived Bethel-Thompson on August 25, 2014.

New England Patriots
Bethel-Thompson was signed to the New England Patriots practice squad on August 31, 2014.
He was released by the Patriots on September 9, 2014.

Minnesota Vikings (second stint)
Bethel-Thompson was signed by the Vikings on September 22, 2014, to the Vikings' practice squad. The signing came in part due to the injury to Matt Cassel, leaving the Vikings with only two healthy quarterbacks on the roster, in Teddy Bridgewater and Christian Ponder. After Bridgewater's week 4 injury, Chandler Harnish was signed to the practice squad and eventually the active roster to back up Ponder in Week 5 against the Green Bay Packers, leaving Bethel-Thompson on the practice squad. He was released from the team on October 7, 2014.

Miami Dolphins (second stint)
On October 15, 2014, Bethel-Thompson was signed to the Miami Dolphins' practice squad. He was released on September 5, 2015, as part of the Dolphins' final roster cuts.  On September 6, 2015, Bethel-Thompson was signed to the Miami Dolphins' practice squad. On September 9, 2015, he was released by the Dolphins.

San Francisco 49ers (third stint)
On November 23, 2015, Bethel-Thompson was signed to the 49ers' practice squad.

Philadelphia Eagles
On February 18, 2016, Bethel-Thompson was signed by the Philadelphia Eagles. On May 17, 2016, Bethel-Thompson was released by Eagles. He was re-signed by the team on July 24, 2016. On September 3, 2016, he was released by the Eagles.

Winnipeg Blue Bombers
Bethel-Thompson was signed to the Winnipeg Blue Bombers' practice roster on September 20, 2016. He was released by the team on October 19, 2016.

Toronto Argonauts

In April 2017, Bethel-Thompson played with a startup developmental minor league, The Spring League. Players were scouted by numerous NFL and CFL teams during the practices and two games played, and Bethel-Thompson earned an invite to workout at a minicamp for the New York Jets. He was not offered a contract following the Jets minicamp, and on May 23, 2017, Bethel-Thompson signed with the Toronto Argonauts of the Canadian Football League. During the 2 game preseason, Bethel-Thompson started at quarterback in one game, and completed 5 passes out of 13 attempts, throwing for 78 yards, and rushing for 1 yard for a first down on a quarterback sneak. Following the release of CFL veteran Drew Willy, Bethel-Thompson made the Argonauts' roster as the 4th quarterback. It was an irregular decision given that the Argonauts elected to keep an additional quarterback on their practice roster, giving them a total of 5 quarterbacks, whereas most CFL teams keep only the required 3 quarterbacks as part of their active roster. On June 24, Bethel-Thompson was placed on the 6-game injured list, and received several extensions. Coming off the injured list after 13 weeks, Bethel-Thompson made his debut on September 23, backing up Argos starter, and fellow Sacramento State alumni Ricky Ray. Bethel-Thompson entered the game during garbage time, and completed his only pass attempt for 8 yards in the 33–19 victory over the Montreal Alouettes. After going 2/2 for 10 yards during the regular season, Bethel-Thompson's Argonauts won the 105th Grey Cup over the Calgary Stampeders. Among the Calgary players activated for this CFL championship game was Ricky Stanzi, Bethel-Thompson's opposing quarterback from the Spring League.

Bethel-Thompson was named the Argos' starting quarterback in Week 8 of the 2018 season after Ricky Ray was out for the season with a neck injury and backup quarterback James Franklin was ineffective in his first four starts. In his first CFL start Bethel-Thompson and the Argos overcame a 24-point deficit to defeat the Ottawa Redblacks 42–41, with Bethel-Thompson completing a 23-yard pass to Armanti Edwards for the game winning score with one second left in the game. After beating the Lions the following week Bethel-Thompson would go on to start and lose the next six games, resulting in the Argos being eliminated from playoff contention. James Franklin was announced as the team's Week 18 starter.

Bethel-Thompson began the 2019 season as the Argos' backup quarterback behind James Franklin. However, Bethel-Thompson was announced the starting quarterback after Franklin was placed on the six-game injured reserve list following the team's Week 3 loss. Bethel-Thompson remained the Argos starting quarterback until Week 16 as the team fell to a record of 2–10: At which time the team announced James Franklin as the starting quarterback. Nevertheless, Bethel-Thompson was promoted to starting quarterback again for the team's Week 18 match against the Redblacks after the team lost both matches with Franklin at the helm. All four wins by the 2019 Argos came with Bethel-Thompson starting at quarterback, and by the end of the season, Bethel-Thompson's career year had produced a CFL best 26 touchdown passes.

During his first three years in the CFL, Bethel-Thompson had also been working towards his master's degree in education from UC Berkeley. The day before he defended his thesis, Bethel-Thompson signed an extension with Toronto.

After the CFL canceled the 2020 season due to the COVID-19 pandemic, Bethel-Thompson chose to opt-out of his contract with the Argonauts on August 25, 2020.

Bethel-Thompson was selected by the Aviators of The Spring League during its player selection draft on October 12, 2020. In three games, he threw for nearly 700 yards and five touchdowns in three games played before a COVID outbreak caused the remaining games to be cancelled and the finals rescheduled. While the Aviators under Bethel-Thompson earned a championship appearance, he declined to attend the game to prepare for “opportunities in more sustainable leagues with more resources available to the players.” Brian Woods, CEO of The Spring League, stated that Bethel-Thompson did not play due to injury, which was vehemently denied by Bethel-Thompson, who felt the attack on his character by Woods was, "disconcerting".

Bethel-Thompson was re-signed by the Toronto Argonauts on May 31, 2021. During the offseason he was in a depth chart battle with Nick Arbuckle, which resulted in Bethel-Thompson beginning the season as the starting quarterback thanks in part to Arbuckle dealing with a lingering hamstring injury. Bethel-Thompson started the first two games of the season, before being replaced by Arbuckle who started the next four games in the middle of the season. Bethel-Thompson was reinstated as the team's starting quarterback in Week 8 and confirmed again in Week 10 after the team's second bye week. On October 26, 2021, Arbuckle was traded to the Edmonton Elks, signaling the Argos' confidence in Bethel-Thompson for the remainder of the season. McLeod Bethel-Thompson and the Argos earned a first round bye but were defeated in the Eastern Division Finals by the Hamilton Tiger-Cats. Following the game, Bethel-Thompson made inappropriate on-field contact with a cameraperson, for which he later apologized. He was subsequently fined by the league for his actions. On January 30, 2022 Bethel-Thompson and the Argos agreed to a one-year contract extension.

McLeod Bethel-Thompson once again began the 2022 season as the Argos' starting quarterback, with Chad Kelly serving as backup. Bethel-Thompson started 17 regular season games during the season, sitting out the final match as the club had already secured the first seed in the East Division with a record of 11–7. Serving as the Argos' starting quarterback for the third consecutive season, Bethel-Thompson continued his strong play, leading the league in pass completions, attempts and passing yards. In the playoffs, he led the Argos past the Montreal Alouettes 34–27, advancing to the Grey Cup final on November 20, 2022. Bethel-Thompson helped lead the Argos to an upset victory over the Winnipeg Blue Bombers.

Following the conclusion of the season there was mounting speculation that McLeod Bethel-Thompson would consider retirement from professional football. In late November 2022, he underwent surgery on the thumb of his throwing hand after suffering an injury in the 109th Grey Cup. In early February he revealed that he was intending to play football in 2023, and if he were to return to the CFL he would only consider playing for the Argos. On February 14, 2023, Bethel-Thompson became a free agent.

New Orleans Breakers
On February 22, 2023, Bethel-Thompson signed with the New Orleans Breakers of the United States Football League (USFL).

CFL statistics

Personal life
Bethel-Thompson is the grandson of the 1948 Olympic shot-put champion Wilbur 'Moose' Thompson. He is also of Scottish and Salvadoran descent through his grandmother. Bethel-Thompson is married to Chinaka Hodge, a poet and writer for theatre, film, and music.

References

External links
Toronto Argonauts bio

1988 births
Living people
Players of American football from San Francisco
Players of Canadian football from San Francisco
American football quarterbacks
Canadian football quarterbacks
American sportspeople of Salvadoran descent
American people of Scottish descent
American players of Canadian football
UCLA Bruins football players
Sacramento State Hornets football players
San Jose SaberCats players
Miami Dolphins players
Minnesota Vikings players
San Francisco 49ers players
Sacramento Mountain Lions players
New England Patriots players
Philadelphia Eagles players
Winnipeg Blue Bombers players
Toronto Argonauts players
The Spring League players
New Orleans Breakers (2022) players